Paddys River is a locality in the Southern Highlands of New South Wales, Australia, in Wingecarribee Shire. The locality was previously known as Murrimba. It is south of Canyonleigh.

At the 2021 census, the population had increased to 64.

References

Towns of the Southern Highlands (New South Wales)
Hume Highway
Wingecarribee Shire